Dominick DeLuise (August 1, 1933 – May 4, 2009) was an American actor, comedian, director, producer, chef, and author. Known primarily for his comedic performances, he rose to fame in the 1970s as a frequent guest on television variety shows. He is often identified for his work in the films of Mel Brooks and Gene Wilder, as well as a series of collaborations and appearances with Burt Reynolds. Beginning in the 1980s, his popularity expanded to younger audiences from voicing characters in several major animated productions, particularly those of Don Bluth.

Early life
DeLuise was born in Brooklyn, New York, to Italian American parents Vincenza "Jennie" (née DeStefano), a homemaker, and John DeLuise, a public employee (garbage collector). He was the youngest of three children, having an older brother, Nicholas "Nick" DeLuise, and an older sister, Antoinette DeLuise-Daurio. DeLuise graduated from Manhattan's High School of Performing Arts and later attended Tufts University in Medford, Massachusetts, where he majored in biology. DeLuise was Roman Catholic and had a particular devotion to the Virgin Mary.

Career
DeLuise's paid stage debut, at age 18, of Bernie the dog was in the drama Bernies Christmas Wish. His first steady gig was as an intern at the Cleveland Play House, 1952-54, as stage manager and actor.

In 1961, DeLuise played in the off-Broadway musical revue Another Evening with Harry Stoons, which lasted nine previews and one performance. Another member of the cast was 19-year-old Barbra Streisand. He was also in the off-Broadway play All in Love, which opened on November 10, 1961, at the Martinique Theatre and ran for 141 performances. Other New York theater performances included Half-Past Wednesday (off-Broadway) (1962); Around the World in 80 Days (off-Broadway) (1963); The Student Gypsy (Broadway) (1963); Here's Love (Broadway) (1963); and Last of the Red Hot Lovers (Broadway) (1969).

DeLuise generally appeared in comedic parts, although an early appearance in the movie Fail-Safe as a nervous USAF technical sergeant showed a broader range. His first acting credit was as a regular performer in the television show The Entertainers in 1964. He gained early notice for his supporting turn in the Doris Day film The Glass Bottom Boat (1966). In his review in The New York Times, Vincent Canby panned the film but singled out the actor, stating, "[T]he best of the lot, however, is a newcomer, Dom DeLuise, as a portly, bird-brained spy."

In the 1970s and 1980s, he often co-starred with his real-life friend Burt Reynolds. Together they appeared in the films The Cannonball Run and Cannonball Run II, Smokey and the Bandit II, The End, and The Best Little Whorehouse in Texas. DeLuise was the host of the television show Candid Camera from 1991 to 1992. He was a mainstay of Burke's Law, an American television series that aired on CBS during the 1993–94 and 1994–95 television seasons.

DeLuise also lent his distinctive voice to various animated films and was a particular staple of Don Bluth's features, playing major roles in The Secret of NIMH, An American Tail, A Troll in Central Park and All Dogs Go to Heaven. All Dogs Go to Heaven also featured Reynolds' voice as Charlie B. Barkin, the cheeky and crazy main character, and DeLuise voiced Itchy Itchiford, Charlie's best friend, wing-man and later partner in business. Unlike DeLuise, however, Reynolds would not contribute a voiceover to any of the eventual film or television series or sequels. 

DeLuise also voiced the legendary character of Charles Dickens' Fagin in the Walt Disney film Oliver & Company and made voice guest appearances on several animated TV series.

TV producer Greg Garrison hired DeLuise to appear as a specialty act on The Dean Martin Show. DeLuise ran through his "Dominick the Great" routine, a riotous example of a magic act gone wrong, with host Martin as a bemused volunteer from the audience. Dom's catchphrase, with an Italian accent, was "No Applause Please, Save-a to the End". The show went so well that DeLuise was soon a regular on Martin's program, participating in both songs and sketches. 

Garrison also featured DeLuise in his own hour-long comedy specials for ABC. (Martin was often off-camera when these were taped, and his distinctive laugh can be heard.)

In 1968, DeLuise hosted his own hour-long comedy variety series for CBS, The Dom DeLuise Show. Taped in Miami at The Jackie Gleason Theater, it featured many regular Gleason show cast members including The June Taylor Dancers and The Sammy Spear Orchestra. DeLuise's wife Carol Arthur also regularly appeared. The 16-week run was the summer replacement for The Jonathan Winters Show. He later starred in his own sitcom, Lotsa Luck (1973–1974).

DeLuise was probably best known as a regular in Mel Brooks' films. He appeared in The Twelve Chairs, Blazing Saddles, Silent Movie, History of the World, Part I, Spaceballs, and Robin Hood: Men in Tights. Brooks' then-wife, actress Anne Bancroft, directed Dom in Fatso (1980).  

DeLuise exhibited his comedic talents while playing the speaking part of the jailer Frosch in the comedic operetta Die Fledermaus at the Metropolitan Opera, playing the role in four separate revivals of the work at the Met between December 1989 and January 1996. In the production, while the singing was in German, the spoken parts were in English. A lifelong opera fan, he also portrayed the role of L'Opinion Publique in drag for the Los Angeles Opera's production of Offenbach's Orpheus in the Underworld.

An avid cook and author of several books on cooking, he appeared as a regular contributor to a syndicated home improvement radio show, On The House with The Carey Brothers, giving listeners tips on culinary topics. He was also a friend and self-proclaimed "look-alike" of famous Cajun chef Paul Prudhomme and author of seven children's books.

Personal life
In 1964, while working in a summer theater in Provincetown, Massachusetts, DeLuise met actress Carol Arthur. They married in 1965 and had three sons, all of whom are actors: Peter, Michael, and David DeLuise.

Death
DeLuise died in his sleep of kidney failure on May 4, 2009, at Saint John's Health Center in Santa Monica, California, at age 75. He had been battling cancer for more than a year prior to his death and was also suffering from high blood pressure and diabetes.

Burt Reynolds paid tribute to DeLuise in the Los Angeles Times, saying: "As you get older and start to lose people you love, you think about it more, and I was dreading this moment. Dom always made you feel better when he was around, and there will never be another like him." Mel Brooks also made a statement to the same paper, telling them that DeLuise "created so much joy and laughter on the set that you couldn’t get your work done. So every time I made a movie with Dom, I would plan another two days on the schedule just for laughter. It's a sad day. It's hard to think of this life and this world without him."

Filmography

Film

Television

Video games

Works

Writings for children
Charlie the Caterpillar, illustrated by Christopher Santoro, Simon & Schuster, 1990
Goldilocks (also known as Goldie Locks & The Three Bears: The Real Story!), illustrated by Santoro, Simon & Schuster, 1992
Hansel & Gretel, by Santoro, Simon & Schuster,1997
The Nightingale (also known as Dom DeLuise's The Nightingale), illustrated by Santoro, Simon & Schuster, 1998
King Bob's New Clothes, illustrated by Santoro, Simon & Schuster, 1999
The Pouch Potato, illustrated by Derek Carter, Bacchus Books, 2001
There's No Place Like Home, illustrated by Tim Brown

Cookbooks
Eat This ... It Will Make You Feel Better: Mamma's Italian Home Cooking and Other Favorites of Family and Friends (also known as Eat This), Simon & Schuster, 1988
Eat This Too! It'll Also Make You Feel Better (also known as Eat This Too!), Atria, 1997
The Pizza Challenge

References

External links

 
 
 
 
 
 McLellan, Dennis. "Dom DeLuise dies at 75; actor was a 'naturally funny man'", Los Angeles Times, May 6, 2009.
 Dom DeLuise Daily Telegraph obituary
 Obituary (by the Associated Press) in The Los Angeles Times

1933 births
2009 deaths
20th-century American comedians
20th-century American male actors
20th-century American male opera singers
20th-century American male singers
20th-century American male writers
20th-century American non-fiction writers
20th-century American singers
21st-century American comedians
21st-century American male actors
21st-century American male singers
21st-century American male writers
21st-century American singers
American children's writers
American cookbook writers
American film producers
American food writers
American male chefs
American male comedians
American male film actors
American male musical theatre actors
American male non-fiction writers
American male opera singers
American male singers
American male stage actors
American male television actors
American male voice actors
American people of Italian descent
American Roman Catholics
American television directors
American writers
Audiobook narrators
Burials at Calvary Cemetery (Queens)
Catholics from New York (state)
Chefs from New York (state)
Chefs from New York City
Comedians from California
Comedians from New York (state)
Comedians from New York City
Comedy film directors
Deaths from cancer in California
Deaths from diabetes
Deaths from kidney failure
DeLuise family
English-language film directors
Entertainers from New York (state)
Film directors from New York (state)
Film producers from New York (state)
Filmmakers from New York (state)
Male actors from Los Angeles
Male actors from New York (state)
Male actors from New York City
People from Brooklyn
Singers from New York City
Television personalities from New York (state)
Tufts University School of Arts and Sciences alumni
Writers from Brooklyn
Writers from New York (state)
Writers from New York City